Liza Frulla  (born March 30, 1949, in Montreal, Quebec), formerly known as Liza Frulla-Hébert, is a former Canadian politician. She was a Liberal Member of the National Assembly of Quebec from 1989 to 1998, a Liberal Member of Parliament from 2002 to 2006, and a member of the Cabinet of Prime Minister Paul Martin.

Background 
All four of Frulla's grandparents were born in Italy and like many Italian Quebeckers, her family was strongly federalist and Quebec Liberal oriented.  In college she says she was not politically involved as she voted "yes" in the 1980 referendum, believing it was only fair to give René Lévesque's government a mandate to negotiate, but when the results were strongly "no", she reverted to federalism.  She then later worked as a marketer for Labatt Breweries when she regularly met with government officials and eventually joined the Quebec Liberals under Robert Bourassa.

Early career

From 1974 to 1976, Frulla worked for the public affairs service of the organizing committee for the 1976 Montreal Olympics. She subsequently became the first woman reporter accredited to cover professional sport in the electronic media.

Provincial politics
From 1989 to 1998, she represented the riding of Marguerite-Bourgeoys in the National Assembly of Quebec.  She was Minister of Communications and Minister of Cultural Affairs. She was vice-chair of the "No" committee in the 1995 Quebec referendum. However, on November 1, 2007, while appearing on the RDI program Le Club des Ex, she admitted to having voted for the "Yes" side in the 1980 referendum.

In 1998, she left the National Assembly to host her own show, Liza, on public broadcaster Radio-Canada until 2002.

Federal politics

She was elected to Parliament in a 2002 by-election in the now-defunct riding of Verdun—Saint-Henri—Saint-Paul—Pointe-Saint-Charles. After that riding was merged with portions of neighbouring ridings to form Jeanne-Le Ber, she was re-elected by a razor-thin margin over Thierry St-Cyr in 2004; she subsequently lost to him in 2006.

Frulla has the prenominal "the Honourable" and the postnominal "PC" for life by virtue of being made a member of the Queen's Privy Council for Canada on December 12, 2003. She was the Minister of Canadian Heritage and Minister responsible for the Status of Women in the cabinet of Prime Minister Paul Martin and previously served as Minister of Social Development.

Honours
In 2016, she was made an Officer of the National Order of Quebec. In 2017, she was appointed as a Member of the Order of Canada.

Electoral record (partial)

References

External links
 

1949 births
Canadian television talk show hosts
Women government ministers of Canada
Women members of the House of Commons of Canada
Canadian people of Italian descent
French Quebecers
Liberal Party of Canada MPs
Living people
Members of the House of Commons of Canada from Quebec
Members of the King's Privy Council for Canada
Politicians from Montreal
Quebec Liberal Party MNAs
Television personalities from Montreal
Women MNAs in Quebec
Canadian women television personalities
Members of the 27th Canadian Ministry
Officers of the National Order of Quebec
21st-century Canadian women politicians
Members of the Order of Canada